In music, Op. 117 stands for Opus number 117. Compositions that are assigned this number include:

 Beethoven – King Stephen
 Brahms – Three Intermezzi
 Fauré – Cello Sonata No. 2
 Mendelssohn - Albumblatt (Album Leaf) in A minor, Op. 117, "Lied ohne Worte"
 Polevoy – The Story of a Real Man
 Schumann – 4 Husarenlieder
 Shostakovich – String Quartet No. 9